The royal standards of England were narrow, tapering swallow-tailed heraldic flags, of considerable length, used mainly for mustering troops in battle, in pageants and at funerals, by the monarchs of England. In high favour during the Tudor period, the Royal English Standard was a flag that was of a separate design and purpose to the Royal Banner. It featured St George's Cross at its head, followed by a number of heraldic devices, a supporter, badges or crests, with a motto—but it did not bear a coat of arms. The Royal Standard changed its composition frequently from reign to reign, but retained the motto Dieu et mon droit, meaning God and my right; which was divided into two bands: Dieu et mon and Droyt.

The standard was equivalent to the modern headquarters flag and played a significant role in the medieval army. Beneath it was pitched the tent of the leader; behind it his retainers would follow; around it they would gather after a charge to regroup; under it they would make their last stand in battle. During the Tudor period the standing army came into being and the standard ceased to be use as an instrument of war. Only to be borne by those who were entitled to fly them.

Standards and devices

Standards

The medieval standard was usually about eight feet long, but Tudor heralds determined different lengths, according to the rank of the nobility. "The Great Standard to be sette before the Kinges pavilion or tent – not to be borne in battle" – was 33-foot long. A duke's standard was 21-foot in length, and that of the humble knight, 12-foot long. These standards, or personal flags, were displayed by armigerous commanders in battle, but mustering and rallying functions were performed by livery flags; notably the standard which bore the liveries and badges familiar to the retainers and soldiers, of which their uniforms were composed. The St. George in the hoist of each standard was the communal symbol of national identity. This badge or banner of England, at the head of the standard, was the indication that the men assembled beneath it were first, Englishmen, and secondly, the followers of the man whose arms were continued on the standard.

There were three main types of heraldic flag.
 A pennon was small, pointed or swallow-tailed at the fly, charged with the badge or other armorial device of the knight who bore it.
 A banner was square or oblong (depth greater than breadth), charged with the arms of the owner with no other device, borne by knight bannerets, ranking higher than other knights, and also by barons, princes and the sovereign.
 A standard was a narrow and tapering (sometimes swallow-tailed) flag, of considerable length (depending on the rank of the owner), generally used only for pageantry, and particularly to display the supporter, badges and livery colours. Mottoes were often introduced bendwise across these standards.

Badges

Badges may possibly have preceded crests. The Norman kings and their sons may have originally used lions as badges of kingship. The lion was a Royal Badge long before heraldic records, as Henry I gave a shield of golden lions to his son-in-law Geoffrey of Anjou in 1127.

The seals of William II and Henry I included many devices regarded as badges. Stephen I used a sagittary (centaur) as a badge. Badges were widely used and borne by the first five Plantagenets, notably the planta genista (broom plant) from which their name derived; a star and crescent interpreted by some as a sun and moon; the genet of Henry II; the rose and thistle of Anne; the white hart of Richard II; the Tudor rose and portcullis. The Stuarts were the last to bear personal badges, ceasing with Anne; the royal badges afterward became more akin to national emblems, evolving into our modern versions.

All sorts of devices were used on standards, generally a beast badge, a plant badge or instead of the latter a simple object (such as a knot). Sometimes the crest was used, but invariably the largest and most dominant object on a standard was one of the supporters. The whole banner was usually fringed with the livery colours, giving the effect of the bordure compony.  Except in funerals, these standards were not used after the Tudor period, probably because of the creation of a standing army in the reign of Henry VIII.

Supporters

Supporters are figures of living creatures each side of an armorial shield, appearing to support it. The origin of supporters can be traced to their usages in tournaments, on Standards, and where the shields of the combatants were exposed for inspection. Medieval Scottish seals afford numerous examples in which the 13th and 14th century shields were placed between two creatures resembling lizards or dragons. The Royal Supporters of the monarchs of England are a menagerie of real and imaginary beasts, including the lion, leopard, panther, and tiger, the antelope, greyhound, a cock and bull, eagle, red and gold dragons, and since 1603 the current unicorn.

Livery colours
The term livery is derived from the French livrée from the Latin liberare, meaning to liberate or bestow, originally implying the dispensing of food, provisions and clothing &c to retainers. In the Middle Ages the term was then applied to the uniforms and other devices, worn by those who accepted the privileges and obligations of embracery, or livery and maintenance. The royal liveries of the later Plantagenets were white and red; those of the House of Lancaster were white and blue, the colours of the House of York were murrey (dark red) and blue. The liveries of the House of Tudor were white and green; those of the House of Stuart – and of George I – were yellow and red. In all subsequent reigns, they have been scarlet and blue.

Motto

Dieu et mon droit (originally Dieu et mon droyt; French: 'God and my right'), as seen on Royal standards since King Edward III, is said to have first been adopted as the royal motto by King Henry V in the 15th century, and consistently so used by most later English (and British) kings, with few exceptions. It appears on a scroll beneath the shield of the Coat of arms of the United Kingdom.

Standards of England

See also

 St George's Cross
 Standard Bearer of England
 Royal Arms of England
 Royal coat of arms of the United Kingdom
 List of English flags
 Heraldry

References

Notes

Bibliography

 
Flags of England
National symbols of England
English heraldry
Military flags
Wars of the Roses
Warfare in medieval England